Kaninë is a settlement in the Vlorë County, southwestern Albania. At the 2015 local government reform it became part of the municipality Vlorë. It is home to the Kaninë Castle.

Name
The toponym is significant for the history of the Albanian language since Kanina represents a toponym that shows no sign of the dialect phenomenon of rhotacism, which is explained by the fact that the settlement was recorded with the name Kanina in a period during which rhotacism in Albanian was no longer active for some time. On the other hand the name of nearby Vlorë, attested earlier, was subject to the Albanian rhotacism.

History
The settlement of Kaninë developed below a hilltop Kaninë Castle which overlooks the village. The first phase of the fort dates to the late 4th/early 3rd century BCE and is linked to the development of fortified sites in the region by Illyrian tribes. Kaninë provided the main route of the Amantes to the sea. The site of Kaninë has been proposed as a possible location for the unidentified ancient site of Thronium, alternatively the site of Triport has been proposed as a possible location for Thronium. The stratigraphy of the site strongly indicate that the remains of the walls of the first phase were used for its rebuilding in late antiquity. Archaeological data coincide with the rebuilding efforts by Justinian in the 6th century CE. One of the forts which Procopius identifies as Kioni in Epirus Vetus may be a reference to Kanina.

In the early Middle Ages, the site seems to have been abandoned and very little activity is archaeologically visible in its vicinity. Kanina and Vlora likely saw a revitalization by the 11th century. In this era, the rebuilt and expanded fortress of Kanina must have acquired an "increasingly defensive and administrative character" in the region. In the 11th–12th centuries, Kanina along with Jericho (Oricum) and Aulon, it formed a Byzantine province. As the Provincia Jericho et Caninon, it appears in the imperial chrysobull granted to Venice in 1198 by Alexios III Angelos. In the 13th century it was part of the Despotate of Epirus, until Michael II Komnenos Doukas gave it as dowry to his daughter Helena Angelina Doukaina when she married King Manfred of Sicily in 1258. In the decade of 1280 Kanina was contested between the Byzantine Empire and the Angevins. The contemporary poet Manuel Philis in his works recalls the campaign of protostrator Michael Glabas Tarchaneiotis. It remained part of the Kingdom of Sicily thereafter, along with Aulon, until at least the 1330s.

Notable people
 Ismail Qemali, diplomat, politician, statesman and Founding Father of Albania
 Donika Kastrioti
 Zihni Kanina

See also 
 Spinarica

References

Sources 

 

Populated places in Vlorë
Villages in Vlorë County
Illyrian Albania
Cities in ancient Illyria
Populated places of the Byzantine Empire
Labëria